Liberty is an unincorporated community in Putnam County, West Virginia, United States. It is located on WV 34 between Red House and Fishers Ridge.

References

Unincorporated communities in Putnam County, West Virginia
Unincorporated communities in West Virginia
Charleston, West Virginia metropolitan area